is the Japanese term for fabric that has been woven with fibers dyed specifically to create patterns and images in the fabric, typically referring to fabrics produced within Japan using this technique. It is a form of ikat dyeing, traditionally resulting in patterns characterized by their blurred or brushed appearance.

The warp and weft threads are resist-dyed in specific patterns prior to dyeing, with sections of the warp and weft yarns tightly wrapped with thread to protect them from the dye. When woven together, the undyed areas interlace to form patterns, with many variations –including highly pictographic and multi-colored results – possible to achieve.  patterns may be applied to either the warp or the weft, or to both in order to create a resulting woven pattern, with the cloth classified using different names depending on the method used.

While  refers to a dyeing technique, literally translating as "common silk stuff", refers to a type of fabric woven from thread spun from noil.  is a hard-faced, hard-wearing, stiff silk fabric with a slight sheen. The confusion stems from the fabric that  fabrics are very commonly, though not always, dyed using the  technique.

History
Ikat techniques were practiced in the Ryukyu Kingdom (modern-day Okinawa) in the 12th or 13th century, and  textiles were produced for export in the 14th century. After the invasion of the Ryukyu Kingdom in 1609,  techniques entered southern Japan and had moved northwards to the Nara area of Honshu by 1750. A general increase in cotton production allowed farmers to weave and dye cotton textiles for their own use and for sale.

As  production continued to spread throughout the country, some rural villages became manufacturing centers. Individual families tied the skeins and wove the cloth, but the dyeing was usually done in community-maintained dyeworks. By 1850,  was being produced in several areas, including the Kurume area of Kyushu, the Iyo area of Shikoku and both the Bingo and San-in regions of Honshu. Some sources claim that  was invented by a young girl, Den Inoue (1788–1869).

Increases in production continued until the 1930s, when the national government outsourced it to the new colonies, shipping pre-dyed threads abroad, where labour was cheaper. Forced labour was used; in 1928, 54% of Japan's ikat weaving was done by unpaid prisoners in China and Korea. By the last quarter of the 20th century, few people could afford the time necessary to dye and hand weave their own cloth. However, contemporary artisans continue to produce highly prized textiles using traditional methods.

Classification and terminology

Warp and/or weft dyed
 :  where only the warp is dyed
 : only the weft is dyed. 
 : both warp and weft are dyed. Classified as a double ikat technique.

Color of dye
 : blue  with white resists on an indigo-blue ground.
 :  using brown instead of indigo. 
 :  using several colors.

Technique

 : The yarn bundles are tied or bound by hand.
 : the dye is applied directly to the bundles of stretched yarn with a spatula.
 : prior to dyeing, the arranged yarns are placed between two engraved plates or boards. The plates are bolted tightly together so that when they are immersed in the dye, the pressure of the raised points act as a resist.
 : weft yarns are woven on a warp of thick cotton yarn. The weft is beaten hard, which packs the weft tightly. When the cloth is dyed, much of the weft is protected from the dye by the heavy warp. The wefts are then woven with new (normal diameter) warps, resulting in a fine dotted pattern. The silk  of Amami Ōshima and the ramie  of Miyakojima, Okinawa are noted for this technique.
 : Only the warp is dyed. This can be done by hand-tying the threads. Alternately, the undyed warp is woven with a coarse temporary weft. This cloth is then printed with the design. The temporary weft is removed, and the warp is returned to the loom. The cloth is then woven with a plain weft.
 : both warp and weft are dyed, either stencil-printed or dyed by hand-tying.
 : the warp is placed on a special printing board and printed with a block printing technique. The dyed warp is then woven.
 : the yarns are dyed with a dip-dye technique.
 : prior to dyeing, the yarn is twisted or plaited, so that parts of the yarn create their own resist. See Bokashi (disambiguation).

By place of production
Examples include:

 Kurume:  (picture )
 Nara: hemp fiber , with 
 Miyakojima, Okinawa: ramie fiber 
 Isesaki, Honshu and Amami Oshima: silk fiber 
 Okinawa:  silk fiber

See also 
Ikat

References

Further reading
 Japanese Ikat Weaving, The Techniques of Kasuri, Jun and Noriko Tomita. Routledge & Kegan Paul.
 Ikat: An Introduction, Ritch, D. & Wada, Y.I., Berkeley: Kasuri Dyeworks, 1st edition 1973, reprinted 1982 - download as pdf

Figured fabrics
Japanese words and phrases
Japanese dyeing techniques
Woven fabrics